PAS Hamedan Football Club (Bashgag-e Futbal-e Pas Hemidan) is an Iranian football club based in Hamedan, Iran and compete in the Azadegan League. The club was formed after the dissolution of Pas Tehran in 2007.

History

Establishment
PAS Hamedan was formed on June 9, 2007 as a result of the dissolution of PAS Tehran. The team was initially named Alvand Hamedan after the Alvand mountain range in Hamedan, however after much deliberation it was changed to PAS Hamedan. PAS stands for Piroozi Esteghamat Sarfarazi (esteghamat starts with Aleph (A) in Persian).

Doping Scandal
In July 2008, it was revealed that numerous players and staff members were involved in distributing illegal doping substances. Midfielders Saeed Daghighi and Faruk Ihtijarević were banned for six months after testing positive for doping in a match against Rah Ahan. Team translator Reza Chalangar and head athletic trainer Morad-Ali Teymouri were found to have been distributing the substances and were banned for four years from involvement in any Iranian sport. In addition, the team was fined for 25,000 Swiss Francs.

Persian Gulf Cup
PAS Hamedan initially enjoyed some success in the IPL. They finished 5th in the 2007–2008 but the team dropped in the rankings in their next three IPL seasons and eventually got relegated in the 2010–2011 season.

Azadegan League
PAS appointed Faraz Kamalvand in their first season in the Azadegan League as they aimed to get promoted back to the IPL. He was sacked in the mid-season break due to poor results and was replaced with Vinko Begović. The team finished the season in 4th place and they failed to get promoted to the IPL.

PAS Novin Hamedan was promoted from the Iran Football's 2nd Division to the Azadegan League following the 2011–12 season and now plays under the name Alvand Hamedan in Group A of the 2012–13 Azadegan League.

PAS finished the 2012–13 Azadegan League (Group B) in 3rd place and qualified to the promotion play-offs following the disqualification of Shahrdari Tabriz over a match-fixing scandal. In the first round of the play-offs PAS defeated Mes Sarcheshmeh 3–2 (2–1, 1–1) after two matches, but lost 5–3 (4–2, 1–1) to Zob Ahan Isfahan in the second round.

Logo history

Season-by-Season

The table below shows the achievements of the club in various competitions.

Players

First-team squad
as of January 5, 2016

For recent transfers, see List of Iranian football transfers summer 2013''.

Managers

Honours
As PAS Tehran

Domestic
 Tehran Province League: (1)
1966–67
 Iran championship cup: (2) 
 1967, 1968
 Iranian Football League: (5)
1976–77, 1977–78, 1991–92, 1992–93, 2003–04

Continental
Asian Club Championship:
 Winners (1): 1992–93

Intercontinental
Afro-Asian Club Championship: (1)
Runner-up: 1993

International
 IFA Shield (IFA): 1970: Runners-up

Notes

References
  Player and Stats

External links

Official
  Official club website

 
Football clubs in Iran
Association football clubs established in 2007
Hamadan
2007 establishments in Iran